Leonie Harm (born 1997) is a German professional golfer who plays on the Houston Cougars golf team since 2015. In 2018, Harm was the first golfer from Germany to win the British Ladies Amateur Golf Championship in the event's history. Her British Amateur win gave her exemptions to multiple LPGA Tour events including the 2018 Women's British Open and 2019 U.S. Women's Open. In team events, Harm played at the European Ladies' Team Championship in 2016, 2017 and 2018 while also appearing at the 2018 Espirito Santo Trophy.

Early life and education
Harm was born in Stuttgart, Germany and attended a biochemical program at the University of Houston for her post-secondary education. At Houston, she began playing with the Houston Cougars golf team in 2015.

Career
As an amateur golfer, Harm competed at the British Ladies Amateur Golf Championship and European Ladies Amateur Championship in 2017. The following year, Harm was the first golfer from Germany to win the British Ladies Amateur Golf Championship. With her 2018 British Amateur win, she won exemptions to the 2018 Women's British Open, 2018 Evian Championship and the 2019 U.S. Women's Open majors held by the LPGA Tour. In amateur events, Harm also received an exemption to the 2019 Augusta National Women's Amateur with her British Amateur win. 

During the 2018 LPGA Tour major events, Harm missed the cut in the British Open and did not play in the Evian Championship. The following year, Harm was cut during the 2019 Augusta Amateur and the 2019 U.S. Women's Open. In team events, Harm competed at the 2016, 2017 and 2018 European Ladies' Team Championship. Apart from European team events, Harm was also a participant at the 2015 Junior Solheim Cup and the 2018 Espirito Santo Trophy.

Harm turned professional in early 2020.

Personal life
In 2013, Harm was in a coma and sustained multiple injuries after being hit by a drunk driver.

Amateur wins
2014 German National Amateur
2015 German International Amateur, German Girls Open, German National Amateur
2017 Texas State Invitational
2018 German International Amateur, British Ladies Amateur
2019 Allstate Sugar Bowl Intercollegiate, Clover Cup, The American Championship

Source:

Team appearances
Junior Solheim Cup (representing Europe): 2015
European Ladies' Team Championship (representing Germany): 2016, 2017, 2018, 2019
Espirito Santo Trophy (representing Germany): 2018
Arnold Palmer Cup (representing the International team): 2019 (winners)
Vagliano Trophy (representing the Continent of Europe): 2019 (winners)

Source:

References

External links

German female golfers
Ladies European Tour golfers
Winners of ladies' major amateur golf championships
Sportspeople from Stuttgart
1997 births
Living people
21st-century German women